Ivan Kelava (born 20 February 1988) is a Croatian professional footballer who most recently played as a goalkeeper for Australian A-League club Melbourne Victory.

Club career

Kelava played for Dinamo Zagreb's youth teams from 1997, being promoted to the club's senior squad in the summer of 2006.

Dinamo Zagreb
He started his first–team career as the club's fourth–choice goalkeeper and did not appear in any competitive matches during the 2006–07 season. Kelava debuted for Dinamo in the Croatian Cup in September 2007, before eventually making his Croatian First League debut in a 2–1 away victory against NK Zadar on 27 October 2007. By the end of the season he managed to establish himself as the club's second–choice goalkeeper, making a total of 7 league appearances. On 2 October 2008, he made his European debut, replacing the injured Tomislav Butina in the opening minutes of the second leg of their UEFA Cup first round fixture against Sparta Prague.

In August 2009, Kelava was loaned to Lokomotiva, where he established himself as their first–choice goalkeeper and made a total of 33 league appearances.

On 16 September 2010, Kelava kept a clean sheet in a 2–0 home win against Villarreal in the club's opening UEFA Europa League group match of the season. He was the first choice goalkeeper in the 2011–12 season as well, becoming a hero among Dinamo fans after making a number of crucial saves in the return leg of the Champions League play-off against Malmö FF which saw Dinamo through.

Udinese / Granada
On 4 July 2013, Kelava joined Udinese for €1 million. He made his Serie A debut on 25 August 2013, starting in a 1–2 away loss against Lazio. After being a backup to Željko Brkić, he subsequently had loan stints at Carpi and Spartak Trnava.

On 25 August 2015, Kelava moved to Udinese's feeder club Granada CF, mainly as a replacement to Real Sociedad-bound Oier Olazábal. On 29 December 2016, he terminated his contract, after being rarely used.

Later years 
On 1 February 2017, Kelava signed for Hungarian club Debrecen on a two and a half year contract. On 15 June of the same year, he joined Romanian club Politehnica Iași. After having spent five years abroad, Kelava returned to his native country on 19 June 2018, and signed for Inter Zaprešić.

International career
Between 2004 and 2010, Kelava was capped over 50 times for Croatia at various youth levels. He won a total of 15 international caps for the Croatian national under-21 football team since making his debut against Chile U20 in a friendly played in Kuala Lumpur on 20 May 2008.

Kelava was called up by Slaven Bilić in the Croatia squad for Euro 2012, but failed to make an appearance in the tournament. Bilić was succeeded by Igor Štimac, who also called up Kelava as an unused third choice goalkeeper behind Stipe Pletikosa and Danijel Subašić for the 2014 FIFA World Cup qualification.

Career statistics

Club

Honours
Dinamo Zagreb
Croatian First League: 2007–08, 2008–09, 2010–11, 2011–12, 2012–13
Croatian Cup: 2007–08, 2008–09, 2010–11, 2011–12

Melbourne Victory
FFA Cup: 2021

References

External links
 
 
 
 
 

1988 births
Living people
Footballers from Zagreb
Association football goalkeepers
Croatian footballers
Croatia youth international footballers
Croatia under-21 international footballers
UEFA Euro 2012 players
GNK Dinamo Zagreb players
NK Lokomotiva Zagreb players
Udinese Calcio players
A.C. Carpi players
FC Spartak Trnava players
Granada CF footballers
Debreceni VSC players
FC Politehnica Iași (2010) players
NK Inter Zaprešić players
Xanthi F.C. players
Melbourne Victory FC players
Croatian Football League players
Serie A players
Serie B players
Slovak Super Liga players
Liga I players
A-League Men players
Croatian expatriate footballers
Expatriate footballers in Italy
Croatian expatriate sportspeople in Italy
Expatriate footballers in Slovakia
Croatian expatriate sportspeople in Slovakia
Expatriate footballers in Spain
Croatian expatriate sportspeople in Spain
Expatriate footballers in Hungary
Croatian expatriate sportspeople in Hungary
Expatriate footballers in Romania
Croatian expatriate sportspeople in Romania
Expatriate footballers in Greece
Croatian expatriate sportspeople in Greece
Expatriate soccer players in Australia
Croatian expatriate sportspeople in Australia